Orb is the fourth album by Minneapolis Celtic rock band Boiled in Lead. It was produced by Hijaz Mustapha of British worldbeat band 3 Mustaphas 3. Orb found Boiled in Lead exploring a wider range of traditional music styles than ever before, moving beyond the confines of the Fairport Convention-influenced Celtic rock of previous albums and adding material from Albania, Romania, Macedonia, Sweden, Appalachia, and Thailand. The album's title reflects this, suggesting an embrace of a truly global musical perspective. Bassist Drew Miller attributed the widening of the band's sound to the eye-opening realization that their European audiences were just as comfortable with American musical styles as with any European forms. "We came to the decision that since we're Americans, there's no reason we have to play all Irish material. So we don't." Brett Durand Atwood of Gavin Report praised the album's eclecticism, calling it "a one-world sonic showcase for the tunes of our brothers, sisters, and ancestors." Besides the many world-music influences, Orb also delves into punk rock and psychobilly with guitarist/vocalist Todd Menton's "Tape Decks All Over Hell."

Track listing

References

1990 albums
Boiled in Lead albums